Acupalpus brunnipes is a ground beetle in the family Carabidae, found in the Palearctic, in northern and western Europe, Greece, and North Africa. It typically lives among moss and litter near water. Like most ground beetles, Acupalpus brunnipes is a predator.

References

brunnipes
Beetles described in 1825